Zakar is a Hebrew word meaning "to remember".

It may also refer to:

Places
Gavrah Zakar, village in Lorestan Province, Iran

People
Zakar Zakarian (1849–1923), French-Armenian painter
Ferenc Polikárp Zakar (1930–2012), Hungarian Cistercian monk
Paul Zakar - guitarist/vocalist of the St Valentines Massacre

Other
Zakar-Baal - the king of Byblos
Zaqar (also known as Dzakar) - a god of dreams in Mesopotamian mythology

See also
Zakaryan, a surname